Nowy Las  (German Neuwalde) is a village in the administrative district of Gmina Głuchołazy, within Nysa County, Opole Voivodeship, in south-western Poland, close to the Czech border.

Before 1945, the village was called Neuwalde and was part of Germany (see Territorial changes of Poland after World War II).

The village has a population of 560.

References

Nowy Las